Aklan may refer to three things in the Philippines:

 Aklan Province
 Aklan languages
 Aklan River

Aklan may also refer to places on Kamchatka
 Aklan, an older name for the river Oklan, a tributary of the Penzhina
 the ancient Russian fort Aklansk near the river Oklan
 a bay and a mountain near the river Oklan